Miami Station is an unincorporated community in Carroll County, Missouri, United States.

History
Miami Station was laid out in 1870 as a station on the St. Louis, Kansas City and Northern Railway; it served as the main freight station for Miami. A post office called Miami Station was established in 1869, and remained in operation until 1951. U.S. Senator William A. Blakley was born in Miami Station.

References

Unincorporated communities in Carroll County, Missouri
Unincorporated communities in Missouri